The Portland State Vikings women's basketball team represents Portland State University in Portland, Oregon. The school's team competes in the Big Sky Conference, and plays its games in the Viking Pavilion, a 3,094-seat arena that opened for the 2018-2019 season. Portland State are currently the defending conference tournament champions.

History
Portland State began play in 1975, and have qualified for the NCAA Division I women's basketball tournament twice, in 2010 and 2019. They have played in the Big Sky Conference since the 1996-1997 season. Since joining the conference, Portland State has won the Big Sky Conference Tournament on two occasions. In 2010, Portland State defeated Montana State University 62-58 in the Big Sky Championship game. In the 2019 Big Sky Championship game, Portland State defeated arch rivals Eastern Washington University 61-59. Portland State has also qualified for the WNIT twice, and won a regular season title in 2011. 

Prior to joining the Big Sky, Portland State women's basketball played in NCAA Div. II. During its tenure in Div. II, Portland State played in the Northwest Basketball League from 1977 until 1982. After 1982, Portland State played in the Mountain West Athletic Conference (MWAC) until 1986. From that point, the team played as an Independent through the 1991 season but later joined the Pacific West Conference from 1991 to 1996. In their time in Div. II, they made the Tournament each year from 1992-1996, making the Final Four in 1992 and the Elite Eight in 1995 and 1996. They went to the Final Four after beating Alaska-Anchorage 101-76, Cal-Davis 83-56, and Saint Joseph's (IN) 83-62, but lost to North Dakota State 93-59 in the semifinals. Portland State won a consolation game 72-69 against Bentley to be crowned 3rd in the Div. II ranks.  As of the end of the 2015-16 season, the Vikings had an all-time record of 553-603.

Postseason results

NCAA Division I
The Vikings have made two appearances in the NCAA Division I women's basketball tournament. They have a combined record of 0–2.

NCAA Division II
The Vikings made five appearances in the NCAA Division II women's basketball tournament. They had a combined record of 12–5.

AIAW Division I
The Vikings made one appearance in the AIAW National Division I basketball tournament, with a combined record of 1–1.

References

External links